The 2002 WDF Europe Cup was the 13th edition of the WDF Europe Cup darts tournament, organised by the World Darts Federation. It was held in Mechelen, Belgium from 17 Oct-19 Oct.



Entered teams

20 countries/associations entered a men's selection in the event.

19 countries/associations entered a womans's selection in the event.

Men's singles

Men's Pairs

Men's team
Round Robin 

Group A

 England 9 - 7  Sweden
 England 9 - 3  Germany
 England 9 - 0  France
 Sweden 9 - 7  Germany
 Sweden 9 - 2  France
 Germany 9 - 2  France

Group B

 Scotland 9 - 5  Italy
 Scotland 9 - 7  Northern Ireland
 Scotland 9 - 3  Austria
 Scotland 9 - 5  Hungary 
 Italy 9 - 5  Northern Ireland 
 Italy 9 - 8  Austria
 Italy 9 - 0  Hungary 
 Northern Ireland 9 - 4  Austria 
 Northern Ireland 9 - 8  Hungary
 Austria 9 - 6  Hungary

Group C

 Netherlands 9 - 2  Denmark
 Netherlands 9 - 3  Ireland
 Netherlands 9 - 2  Switzerland
 Netherlands 9 - 1  Latvia  
 Denmark 9 - 8  Ireland
 Denmark 9 - 3  Switzerland
 Denmark 9 - 0  Latvia 
 Ireland 9 - 6  Switzerland
 Ireland 9 - 1  Latvia
 Switzerland 9 - 5  Latvia

Group D

 Finland 9 - 6  Belgium
 Finland 9 - 0  Norway
 Finland 9 - 4  Russia
 Wales 9 - 8  Finland
 Wales 9 - 4  Norway
 Wales 9 - 3  Russia
 Belgium 9 - 8  Wales
 Belgium 9 - 4  Norway
 Belgium 9 - 6  Russia
 Norway 9 - 3  Russia 

Knock Out

Woman's singles

Woman's Pairs
Round Robin 

Group A

 Karin Krappen & Francis Hoenselaar 4 - 2  Olga Meyer & Anastasia Dobromyslova
 Karin Krappen & Francis Hoenselaar 4 - 0  Britt-Randi Sandåker & Mette Engen-Hansen
 Denise Cassidy & Norma Irvine 4 - 2  Karin Krappen & Francis Hoenselaar
 Denise Cassidy & Norma Irvine 4 - 1  Britt-Randi Sandåker & Mette Engen-Hansen
 Olga Meyer & Anastasia Dobromyslova 4 - 1  Denise Cassidy & Norma Irvine
 Olga Meyer & Anastasia Dobromyslova 4 - 3  Britt-Randi Sandåker & Mette Engen-Hansen

Group B

 Nora Kautzky & Nora Fekete 4 - 2  Bianka Strauch & Heike Ernst
 Nora Kautzky & Nora Fekete 4 - 1  Carine Dessein & Tanja Deprez
 Nora Kautzky & Nora Fekete 4 - 2  Inese Grencione & Inita Bite
 Nora Kautzky & Nora Fekete 4 - 2  Gerlinde Hristovski & Monika Schartner
 Bianka Strauch & Heike Ernst 4 - 1  Carine Dessein & Tanja Deprez
 Bianka Strauch & Heike Ernst 4 - 0  Inese Grencione & Inita Bite
 Bianka Strauch & Heike Ernst 4 - 1  Gerlinde Hristovski & Monika Schartner
 Carine Dessein & Tanja Deprez 4 - 1  Inese Grencione & Inita Bite
 Carine Dessein & Tanja Deprez 4 - 0  Gerlinde Hristovski & Monika Schartner
 Inese Grencione & Inita Bite 4 - 2  Gerlinde Hristovski & Monika Schartner

Group C

 Trina Gulliver & Clare Bywaters 4 - 2  Anne Kirk & Janette Higgins
 Trina Gulliver & Clare Bywaters 4 - 1  Jan Robbins & Julie Gore
 Trina Gulliver & Clare Bywaters 4 - 2  Mojca Humar & Michela Zangheri
 Trina Gulliver & Clare Bywaters 4 - 0  Jaan Laitinen & Marika Juhola  
 Anne Kirk & Janette Higgins 4 - 1  Mojca Humar & Michela Zangheri
 Anne Kirk & Janette Higgins 4 - 1  Jaan Laitinen & Marika Juhola 
 Jan Robbins & Julie Gore 4 - 1  Anne Kirk & Janette Higgins   
 Jan Robbins & Julie Gore 4 - 1  Jaan Laitinen & Marika Juhola 
 Mojca Humar & Michela Zangheri 4 - 2  Jan Robbins & Julie Gore
 Mojca Humar & Michela Zangheri 4 - 1  Jaan Laitinen & Marika Juhola   
Group D

 Maud Jansson & Carina Ekberg 4 - 3  Debbie Doyle & Olive McIntyre 
 Maud Jansson & Carina Ekberg 4 - 0  Mona Lund & Annette Hakonsen
 Maud Jansson & Carina Ekberg 4 - 3  Sabine Beutler & Lisa Huber 
 Maud Jansson & Carina Ekberg 4 - 2  Valere Gaudion & Anita Chausson
 Debbie Doyle & Olive McIntyre 4 - 3  Mona Lund & Annette Hakonsen
 Debbie Doyle & Olive McIntyre 4 - 1  Sabine Beutler & Lisa Huber
 Mona Lund & Annette Hakonsen 4 - 2  Sabine Beutler & Lisa Huber
 Mona Lund & Annette Hakonsen 4 - 3  Valere Gaudion & Anita Chausson 
 Sabine Beutler & Lisa Huber 4 - 0  Valere Gaudion & Anita Chausson   
 Valere Gaudion & Anita Chausson 4 - 3  Debbie Doyle & Olive McIntyre

Knock Out

References

Darts tournaments